Culkerton Halt railway station served the hamlet of Culkerton, Gloucestershire, England, from 1889 to 1964 on the Tetbury Branch Line.

History 
The station was opened as Culkerton on 2 December 1889 by the Great Western Railway. It closed temporarily on 5 March 1956 but reopened as Culkerton Halt on 2 February 1959, although Bradshaw didn't add 'Halt' until May of the following year. It closed permanently on 6 April 1964.

References 

Disused railway stations in Gloucestershire
Former Great Western Railway stations
Beeching closures in England
Railway stations in Great Britain opened in 1889
Railway stations in Great Britain closed in 1956
Railway stations in Great Britain opened in 1959
Railway stations in Great Britain closed in 1964
1889 establishments in England
1964 disestablishments in England